Hippolyte Destailleur (27 September 1822 – 17 November 1893) was a French architect, interior designer, and collector. He is noted for his designs and restoration work for great châteaux in France and in England, as well as his collection of books, prints, and drawings, covering French artists of the 18th and 19th centuries, much of which is now in the Cabinet des Estampes of the Bibliothèque Nationale, Paris (Destailleur Collection).

Early life and career 
Born Hippolyte-Alexandre-Gabriel-Walter Destailleur in Paris, he was the son of François-Hippolyte Destailleur (born Paris, 22 March 1787; died Paris, 15 February 1852), also a noted French architect, who studied with Charles Percier and became architect to the Ministère de la Justice in 1819. Hippolyte studied with François-René Leclère at the École des Beaux-Arts in Paris (1842–1846), after which he worked with his father and with Étienne-Hippolyte Godde. In 1853 he became the head of the family practice and succeeded his father at the Ministère de la Justice.

Later career 

Hippolyte Destailleur became a fashionable architect, catering to rich and titled clients. He mimicked French styles of the 16th to 18th centuries, distinguishing himself from many of his contemporaries, who favored medieval, Italian Renaissance, or antique models.

He is one of the best-known foreign architects to have worked in 19th century England, where he designed Waddesdon Manor in Buckinghamshire for Baron Ferdinand de Rothschild (1874–1882) and the Imperial Mausoleum at Saint Michael's Abbey in Farnborough, Hampshire.

He oversaw the designwork and restoration of the Château de Courances and Château de Vaux-le-Vicomte beginning in 1875. He designed the Hôtel de Béhague in Paris (1866-1867) and the Château de Franconville in Oise for the Duc de Massa (1880–1885).

His son Walter-André Destailleur was also an architect, who built the Château de Trévarez.

Hippolyte Destailleur died in Paris.

References 
Notes

Sources
 Midant, Jean-Paul (1996). "Destailleur. French family of architects.", vol. 8, pp. 816–817, in The Dictionary of Art, edited by Jane Turner, reprinted with minor corrections in 1998. New York: Grove. .
 Middleton, R. D. (1982). "Destailleur, Hippolyte-Alexandre-Gabriel", vol. 1, pp. 567–568, in Macmillan Encyclopedia of Architects, 4 volumes, edited by Adolf K. Placzek. London: The Free Press. .

Further reading

External links 
 Waddesdon Manor official website
Destailleur in the Waddesdon Collection

1822 births
1893 deaths
Architects from Paris
French bibliophiles
19th-century French architects
Waddesdon Manor
Collectors from Paris